Sebastián Vidal y Soler (Barcelona, April 1, 1842-Manila, July 28, 1889) was a Spanish forester and botanist.

Sebastián Vidal and his lesser known brother, Domingo, studied at the Spanish forestry school. In the 1870s they both took up posts in the forestry service of the Philippines, which was a Spanish colonial possession.

Sebastián Vidal had a particular interest in woody plants, but studied Malesian flora in general, collecting specimens, collaborating with other botanists, and publishing a number of works including Revision de Plantas Vasculares Filipinas (Manila 1886).

In 1883 he was back in Europe and visited herbaria there including that of Kew.

Vidal served as director of the Botanical Garden of Manila from 1878 until his death in 1889 from cholera.  A statue of Vidal by Enric Clarasó was erected in the Garden, although it no longer survives.

Honours
In 1887 a Philippines Exposition was organised in Madrid. There was a section devoted to Geografía botánica del Archipiélago, su flora, la forestal y fauna ('Botanical geography of the Archipelago, its flora, forest and fauna'). Plants were exhibited at the newly constructed Palacio de Cristal in the Retiro Park. For his contribution, Vidal received the honour of entry into the Order of Isabella the Catholic.

Plant specimens
Although the herbarium in Manila was destroyed in a fire in 1897, some of Vidal's specimens of Philippine flora are preserved in Europe to this day, at Kew, where he collaborated with Robert Allen Rolfe, and at Madrid's Real Jardín Botánico, where, since Vidal's death Benjamín Máximo Laguna and later scholars have worked on them.

References

External links

19th-century Spanish botanists
Botanists active in the Philippines
Spanish foresters
Spanish people of the colonial Philippines
Infectious disease deaths in the Philippines
Filipino foresters
1842 births
1889 deaths
Forestry in Spain
Forestry in the Philippines
Deaths from cholera